Irmtrud Wojak (born 1963) is a German historian. From the end of March 2009 until November 2011, she was the founding director of the Munich Documentation Centre for the History of National Socialism.

Life 
Wojak studied history, social history and economic history as well as political science at the Ruhr-Universität Bochum. She gained her doctorate with a thesis on German Jewish and political emigration during the NS period to Latin America, also in Bochum. She then completed several research stays, including at the Yad Vashem Holocaust Memorial in Jerusalem and at the United States Holocaust Memorial Museum in Washington.

In Frankfurt, she created the exhibition "Auschwitz-Prozess. 4 Ks 2/63. Frankfurt am Main" and habilitated herself with a biography of Fritz Bauer. She then became head of research and a member of the management team at the International Tracing Service (ITS) in Bad Arolsen.

Her main areas of research are.
 History of National Socialism and the Holocaust
 Exile research
 History of the Federal Republic of Germany, especially legal reappraisal in the post-war period

Founding director of the NS Documentation Centre Munich 
Wojak was appointed founding director of the planned Nazi Documentation Centre in Munich in 2009. According to media reports, in May 2011 there were heated arguments between individual Munich city councillors, the centre's board of trustees and Wojak, among others, about the name of the planned centre. Wojak spoke out against a name that contained the abbreviation "NS". The board of trustees of the planned centre and several contemporary witnesses had expressed similar views.<ref>[http://www.sueddeutsche.de/muenchen/ns-dokumentationszentrum-muenchen-heftiger-streit-um-ein-kuerzel-1.1079977 "NS-Dokumentationszentrum München": Heftiger Streit um ein Kürzel], Süddeutsche Zeitung, 31 March 2011</ref> The centre had been planned by the city of Munich from the beginning under the working name "NS-Dokumentationszentrum". Munich city councillor Marian Offman stressed that not all contemporary witnesses had spoken out against the abbreviation. Wojak is then said to have indirectly accused Offman of playing contemporary witnesses off against each other. The Lord Mayor Christian Ude announced disciplinary steps in April 2011 as a result of this, and the city councillor Marian Offman, who is also vice-president of the Jewish Community of Munich, demanded an apology from Wojak. Wojak also saw this as a party-political dispute.

At the end of October 2011, Wojak was relieved of her duties as director of the NS Documentation Centre because she had not presented a coherent concept for the exhibition at the NS Documentation Centre. In addition, her communication style was criticised. She had also failed to cooperate with her team. Wojak, on the other hand, initially emphasised that she had not had the opportunity to explain her concept, as it had been presented without her on 7 October due to illness. In mid-November, an agreement was finally reached and a joint press release was issued by Wojak and the City of Munich, which spoke of "sustained differences of opinion" between Wojak and the advisory bodies about the "orientation, content and function" of the planned centre, due to which a separation had taken place. Press release NS-Dokumentationszentrum München.

 Awards 
 2014: For her biography on the life of Fritz Bauer, Wojak became the first German historian to be appointed  at the Radcliffe Institute for Advanced Study at Harvard University.

 Publications 
 Fritz Bauer 1903–1968. Eine Biographie, Munich 2009
 Eichmanns Memoiren. Ein kritischer Essay, Frankfurt 2001
 Exil in Chile. Die deutsch-jüdische und politische Emigration während des Nationalsozialismus 1933–1945, Berlin 1994
 Irmtrud Wojak und Susanne Meinl (ed.) im Auftrag des Fritz-Bauer-Instituts: Völkermord und Kriegsverbrechen in der ersten Hälfte des 20. Jahrhunderts'', Frankfurt: Campus-Verlag 2004, .

References

External links 
 
 NS-Dokuzentrum braucht neuen Chef, in Süddeutsche Zeitung, 28 October 2011

German women historians
20th-century German historians
Historians of Nazism
1963 births
Living people
Place of birth missing (living people)
21st-century German historians